Diiron propanedithiolate hexacarbonyl is the organoiron complex with the formula Fe2(S2C3H6)(CO)6.  It is a red diamagnetic solid.  It adopts a symmetrical structure with six terminal CO ligands.  The complex is a precursor to hydrogenase mimics.

It is prepared by the reaction of 1,3-propanedithiol with triiron dodecarbonyl: 
2 Fe3(CO)12 +  3 C3H6(SH)2   →   3 Fe2(S2C3H6)(CO)6  +  3 H2 +  6 CO
In general, the CO ligands can be substituted by cyanide, phosphines, isocyanides, N-heterocyclic carbenes, and other donor ligands. Monosubstitution can be achieved through an in situ generation of the acetonitrile complex.

Upon irradiation of Fe2(S2C3H6)(CO)6 with ultraviolet (UV) light, CO-photolysis occurs with the transient formation of the unsaturated species  followed by the formation of the solvent adduct.

References 

Carbonyl complexes
Organoiron compounds
Thiolates
Chemical compounds containing metal–metal bonds